An electric carving knife or electric knife is an electrical kitchen device used for slicing foods. The device consists of two serrated blades that are clipped together. When the appliance is switched on, the blades continuously move lengthways to provide the sawing action. They were popular in the United Kingdom in the 1970s.

Invention
The invention of the electric knife is usually attributed to Jerome L. Murray, but there are other claimants, such as Clem E. Kosterman, who filed a patent in 1939.

Electric knives can be corded or cordless.

Other uses
They are also sometimes used for other purposes, including sculpting polyurethane foam rubber, cutting wood, cutting metal, and other solid or semi-solid substances and materials.

Cultural references
In the 1981 horror film Possession, the character of Anna cuts her neck with an electric knife.
In the 1986 horror film Maximum Overdrive, an electric knife turns itself on and cuts waitress Wanda June.
In the third-season Simpsons episode "Dog of Death", Homer attempts to use an electric knife to carve a Thanksgiving turkey at the table, sending pieces of it flying at other family members.
In Stephen King's 1987 novel Misery, Annie Wilkes slices off Paul Sheldon's thumb with an electric knife.

See also 
 Reciprocating saw

References 

Kitchen knives
Food preparation appliances
20th-century inventions
American inventions